Johann-Heinrich Fehler (20 September 1910 – 15 May 1993) was the commander of German submarine U-234 in World War II. He previously served on the commerce raider Atlantis.  In 1956 he published his memoirs in London with Arthur V. Sellwood, as Dynamite for Hire: The story of Hein Fehler. They were republished in 1972 as a Tandem paperback titled The Warring Seas.

Decorations
Iron Cross 2nd Class (1940)
 Iron Cross 1st Class (1940)
 Merchant Raider Badge (1941)
German Cross in Gold (1942)

References

External links 
The Long Blue Line: Coast Guardsman Eliot Winslow, Nazi Johann-Heinrich Fehler and the surrender of U-234 « Coast Guard COAST GUARD COMPASS

1910 births
1993 deaths
U-boat commanders (Kriegsmarine)
Military personnel from Berlin
German memoirists
Recipients of the Iron Cross (1939), 1st class
Recipients of the Iron Cross (1939), 2nd class
Recipients of the Gold German Cross
20th-century memoirists